Rożnów may refer to the following places in Poland:
Rożnów, Lower Silesian Voivodeship (south-west Poland)
Rożnów, Lesser Poland Voivodeship (south Poland)
Rożnów, Opole Voivodeship (south-west Poland)
Lake Rożnów in Lsser Poland Voivodeship